Thanks for Sharing is a 2012 American comedy-drama film directed by Stuart Blumberg, who co-wrote the screenplay with Matt Winston. The film stars Mark Ruffalo, Tim Robbins, Gwyneth Paltrow, Josh Gad, Joely Richardson, Patrick Fugit, Carol Kane, and Pink (credited as Alecia Moore), with a supporting cast including Michaela Watkins, Emily Meade, and Isiah Whitlock Jr.

The film premiered at the 2012 Toronto International Film Festival to mixed reviews, and was released in the United States a year later.

Plot
Set in New York City, Thanks for Sharing centers around three people undergoing a 12-step process to recover from their sexual addiction.

Adam has been abstinent for five years. He's shown walking the streets of New York, tempted by sexy ads and gorgeous women on his way to work. Neil is a young doctor who's been court ordered to attend sex addiction meetings after he was convicted of frottage (rubbing against people in public). He's shown grinding against a stranger on the subway (and getting punched for it) on the way to the sex addiction meeting. Mike is a married recovering sex addict and group leader. He sponsors Adam, who in turn sponsors Neil.

They are all at the sex addiction meeting, talking about their progress. Neil lies about being one month sober to the addiction group. At the coffee shop social afterwards, Mike encourages Adam to date, saying "it's time." Adam says he's not sure.

Neil is shown being a good doctor at work, but also making inappropriate jokes, which gets him in trouble. Adam had asked Neil to do journaling work, but Neil has blown it off, watching porn instead. When Adam finds out, he says he can no longer sponsor Neil if he's not going to do the work.

Adam meets Phoebe at a party and they hit it off. They go out on a date, where Phoebe reveals she is a breast cancer survivor and her ex is an alcoholic. She says she refuses to date another addict, and while Adam assures her he's not an alcoholic, he doesn't tell her the whole truth about his own addiction. They begin a relationship.

Dede joins the sex addiction meetings, saying her addiction began from a very young age and sex is the only way she knows how to relate to men.

At Neil's work, he tries to excuse his behavior the previous day to his boss, and by accident is caught secretly filming up her skirt. Only after he's fired does he admit to the group that he's out of control and intends to take his meetings seriously. Adam agrees to sponsor him once again, but demands that he isn't allowed to take the subway, and must attend 90 meetings in 90 days. Neil, clearly freaked out, agrees.

Meanwhile, Mike's son Danny, a recovering drug addict, has returned home and is attempting to make amends to his parents. He tells them he's been clean and sober for the past eight months, and has been traveling around the country.

Phoebe discovers a sobriety medal after sleeping with Adam and confronts him about it. Adam admits the sex addiction, and Phoebe seems judgmental. Which Adam says is why he was hesitant to tell her. She takes some time away from him, but eventually she returns, and asks him what his sex addiction looked like. He tells her everything: about the constant masturbation, hitting on every woman he met, one-night stands, and prostitutes. She expresses worry that he'll fall off the wagon. After Adam tells her his sobriety is the most important thing in his life, she agrees to resume their relationship.

Dede calls Neil in a panic, wanting to have sex with her abusive ex, but she can't get a hold of her sponsor. Neil is very compassionate and talks her through what the ramifications of her having sex with her ex would be. He literally runs to her location to give her support. She lends Neil her bike, and soon we see him embracing the biking lifestyle. Later they go dancing. They almost kiss, but don't.

Phoebe and Adam are having a nice dinner when they are approached by a young girl who is clearly one of Adam's casual flings. Phoebe makes a joke about it, but later that night she catches Adam on the phone. He says it's someone he sponsors. Phoebe doesn't believe him and asks to see his phone. At first Adam refuses but then relents. He was telling the truth but it's clear Phoebe doesn't trust him. Adam brings up some of Phoebe's issues, and the two have harsh words, with Phoebe leaving.

Mike and Danny get into a fight when Mike assumes he stole his mother's pills. Danny mentions Mike gave Katie hepatitis C, and confronts him about hitting him as a child. Mike slaps him, he attacks back knocking Katie over; realizing what he has done, Danny panics and runs out.

The next day Adam goes on a work trip to DC. There he tries to get hold of Mike for support, as he's afraid he's going to fall off the wagon. Since Mike is busy with family issues, Adam goes on a bender. He buys a laptop to jerk off to porn, and hires a prostitute.

Dede goes over to Neil's and helps him to clean up his house and burn his porn. She admits she has never been "just friends" with a man before.

Mike finds Katie's pills, realizing Danny didn't steal them. She tells him off for "always having to be right" and tells him to leave the house. While he is about to relapse with a bottle of bourbon, Katie calls to tell him Danny is in the hospital after a DUI. Danny says Mike is probably glad to see he fucked up, but Mike, clearly upset, hugs his son and says, "I'm sorry" over and over.

After he returns to New York, Adam invites Becky over, and they start doing daddy/daughter role play. It gets intense very quickly and Becky starts slapping Adam, daring him to slap her back. When he tells her he isn't into that, she freaks out and starts screaming and crying, then locks herself in the bathroom. In desperation Adam calls Neil, who takes the train to get to Adam's. He breaks down the bathroom door and discovers Becky has taken a bunch of pills. Neil switches to calm doctor mode and takes care of her.

Adam gets sober and apologizes to Phoebe, who admits she needed to hear what he said about her own issues. Neil confronts his inappropriately sexual mother, Roberta, and the addicts celebrate their sobriety.

Cast
 Mark Ruffalo as Adam
 Tim Robbins as Mike
 Gwyneth Paltrow as Phoebe
 Josh Gad as Neil
 Joely Richardson as Katie
 Alecia Moore as Dede
 Patrick Fugit as Danny
 Carol Kane as Roberta
 Michaela Watkins as Marney
 Isiah Whitlock Jr. as Charles
 Emily Meade as Becky
 Poorna Jagannathan as Lili Kazhani
 Okieriete Onaodowan as Lou
 David Wain, Brian Koppelman and Matt Winston make cameos as SAA Group Members

Reception
Thanks for Sharing was met with mixed reviews. On Rotten Tomatoes, the film has a positive score of 51% based on 114 reviews, with an average rating of 5.59/10. The site's critics consensus reads: "Thanks For Sharing showcases some fine performances but doesn't delve into its thorny premise as deeply as it should". Metacritic reports a score of 54 out of 100, based on 38 reviews, indicating "Mixed or average reviews".

Richard Roeper gave the film a largely positive review, saying "First-time director Blumberg does a fine job and makes some brave choices." Laremy Legel of Film.com was among the most critical, giving the film a D+, and commenting that it "can't quite find its footing as either a drama or a comedy, and near the end it's actively sliding off the rails". Nigel Barrington of the Daily Chronicle also criticized the film heavily, dubbing it First World Problems: The Movie. Otherwise, Alecia Moore's role was praised by critics. Dan Callahan wrote about her performance saying, "Of all the cast here, the least experienced is the pop singer Pink, yet she does the best acting in the film: natural, a little harsh, a little unstable. Pink, like Macy Gray in her Lee Daniels movie roles, knows instinctively how to behave on camera by just pretending that the camera isn't there." Sandy Schaefer praised the film, arguing that "the good elements outweigh the bad in Thanks for Sharing and the final result is a commendable examination of addiction, sex and the nature of grown-up relationships (among other issues that are rarely black and white)."

References

External links
 
 
 
 
 

2012 films
2012 comedy-drama films
2012 directorial debut films
2012 independent films
American comedy-drama films
American independent films
Films about sex addiction
Films scored by Christopher Lennertz
Films set in New York City
Films shot in New York City
Lionsgate films
2010s English-language films
2010s American films